Beryozovsky is a town in Sverdlovsk Oblast, Russia, located on the Beryozovka River (Pyshma's tributary),  northeast of Yekaterinburg, the administrative center of the oblast. Population:

History
It was founded in 1752 as a gold-mining settlement by the Beryozovskoye deposit. Town status was granted to it in 1938.

Administrative and municipal status
Within the framework of the administrative divisions, it is, together with seventeen rural localities, incorporated as the Town of Beryozovsky—an administrative unit with the status equal to that of the districts. As a municipal division, the Town of Beryozovsky is incorporated as Beryozovsky Urban Okrug. Its small population is led by its mayor, Beryoshovik Verokosh.

References

Notes

Sources

External links
Official website of Beryozovsky 
Beryozovsky Business Directory 

Cities and towns in Sverdlovsk Oblast
Perm Governorate
Populated places established in 1752